Carmen Pacheco Rodríguez (Born in 1951 in Linares, Jaén), better known by her stage name Carmen Linares, is one of the finest flamenco singers in Spain.

She belongs to the best generation of flamenco artists with Paco de Lucía, Camarón, Enrique Morente, Jose Mercé, Manolo Sanlúcar and Tomatito and she is considered as flamenco legend. Carmen Linares has carved out a place for herself in contemporary Spanish musical culture. 

She was awarded Spain's Premio Nacional de Música for interpretation in 2001. In 2022 she received the Princess of Asturias Award in the category "Arts".

Biography 
Born in Linares, in the heart of Andalusia. Carmen Linares is known as one of the finest flamenco singers in Spain. 

She moved to Madrid with her family in 1965. Her professional career began in the dance company of Carmen Mora, and she made her first recording in 1971.

She is also recognized as flamenco lead vocal reference and maestra for young generation like Miguel Poveda, Estrella Morente, Pitingo, and Arcangel. She’s conquered a privileged position in the genre of world music. Become one of flamenco music’s most critically acclaimed and international artists in history of flamenco. 

In the 70s and 80s she worked in Madrid alongside artists such as Enrique Morente, Camarón, Carmen Mora, and the brothers Juan and Pepe Habichuela. That’s how it all began.

In the 90’s Carmen Linares has performed Manuel de Falla’s El Amor Brujo, under conductors such as Josep Pons, Leo Brower, Rafael Frübech de Burgos and Victor Pablo in venues including the Lincoln Center in New York, the Sydney Opera House, and the Royal Albert Hall in London.

She has recorded classic albums such as Cantaora, Canciones Populares de Lorca, Antología de la mujer el cante and Raíces y Alas. Her on-stage performances include collaborations with artists such as Manolo Sanlucar, Eva Yerbabuena, Victor Ullate, Uri Caine, Blanca Lí, Irene Papas, María Pagés and Lola Herrera.

Over the last twenty years she has appeared in shows all over the world, with her performances of “Oasis Abierto,” “Ensayo Flamenco,” “Remembranzas,” “Encuentro,” and “Cu4tro”. In these shows, Carmen played alongside artists such as Belén Maya, Jorge Pardo, Juan Manuel Cañizares, Gerardo Núñez, Rafaela Carrasco, Tomasito, Juan Carlos Romero, Miguel Poveda, Marina Heredia, Carles Benavent, Javier Barón, Tino Di Geraldo, etc..

She has sang the verses of most recognized spanish poets such as Juan Ramón Jiménez, Federico García Lorca and Miguel Hernández. In 2018 she released her new album “Verso a Verso” and perform with the show “Tempo de Luz” in Carnegie Hall in New York, Adrienne Arsht Center in Miami,  Wilshire Ebell Theatre  in Los Angeles and Sadlers Wells in London. 

“Carmen Linares’ voice has a unique expressive power.” NEW YORK TIMES

In season 2021/2022 she launches “Cantaora: 40 years of Flamenco”. The most important singer of the current flamenco presents a unique show with the most significant songs of her artistic life. 

This shows has an extraordinary setlist with antologic women styles, Federico García Lorca lyrics, tribute to Paco de Lucía and Enrique Morente and guest artists in every shows as Estrella Morente, Luz Casal, Miguel Poveda, Arcángel, Joan Manuel Serrat, and Silvia Pérez Cruz. Carmen’s voice seeks out intimacy to convey her flamenco expression in this selection of unique songs.

She is the only flamenco woman artist who has won the National Music Award by Ministry of Culture of Spain in 2001.  In 2022 she received the Princess of Asturias Award in the category "Arts".

Recent Discography

References

External links 
Foro Flamenco

1951 births
Living people
People from Linares, Jaén
Flamenco singers
Singers from Andalusia
Spanish women singers
Women in Latin music